Alice Chetwynd Ley, née Humphrey (born 12 October 1913 in Halifax, Yorkshire, England, UK – d. 2004) was a British writer of romance novels from 1959 to 1989.

She was the sixth elected Chairman (1971–1973) of the Romantic Novelists' Association and was named honor life member.

Biography
Born Alice Chetwynd Humphrey on 12 October 1913 in Halifax, Yorkshire, England, UK, she studied at King Edward VI Grammar School in Birmingham. On 3 February 1945, she married Kenneth James Ley. They had two sons; Richard James Humphrey Ley and Graham Kenneth Hugh Ley.

She was teacher at Harrow College of Higher Education. In 1962, she obtained a diploma in Sociology at London University, in connection thus she obtained the Gilchrist Award of 1962. She was lecturer in Sociology and Social History, from 1968 to 1971.

Under her married name, Alice Chetwynd Ley, she published romance novels from 1959 to 1986. She was also tutor in Creative Writing, from 1962 to 1984. She was elected the sixth Chairman (1971–1973) of the Romantic Novelists' Association and was named honour life member.

Alice Chetwynd died in 2004.

Bibliography

Novels
The Jeweled Snuff Box (1959)
The Georgian Rake (1960)
The Guinea Stamp (1961)  The Courting of Joanna
The Master of Liversedge (1966) a.k.a. The Master and the Maiden
Letters for a Spy (1970) a.k.a. The Sentimental Spy
The Tenant of Chesdene Manor (1974) a.k.a. Beloved Diana
The Beau and the Bluestocking (1975)
An Advantageous Marriage (1977)
At Dark of the Moon (1977)
Regency Scandal (1979)
A Conformable Wife (1981)
The Intrepid Miss Haydon (1983)

Eversley Saga
The Clandestine Betrothal (1967)
The Toast of the Town (1968)
A Season at Brighton (1971)

Anthea & Justin Rutherford Saga
A Reputation Dies (1984)
A Fatal Assignation (1987)
Masquerade of Vengeance (1989)

References and sources

                   

English romantic fiction writers
1913 births
2004 deaths
Place of death missing
20th-century English novelists